Turek is a town in central Poland.

Turek may also refer to:

People
Frank Turek (born 1961), American Christian author
Friedrich Turek (born 1940), Austrian ice hockey player
Gavin Turek, American singer and actress
Jerry Turek (born 1975), Canadian tennis player
John Turek (born 1983) American basketball player
Joshua Turek (born 1979), American wheelchair basketball player
Josef Turek (born 1971), Czech ice hockey player and coach
Roman Turek (born 1970), Czech ice hockey player
Svatopluk Turek (1900–1972), Czech novelist
Toni Turek (1919–1984), German football goalkeeper

Places
Turek, Poland
Turek, Środa Wielkopolska County in Greater Poland Voivodeship (west-central Poland)
Turek, Masovian Voivodeship (east-central Poland)
Turek, Podlaskie Voivodeship (north-east Poland)

Other uses
Turek, Polish as well as Czech or Slovak term for man or boy of Turkish people

See also 
 Rosalyn Tureck